Janus is a masculine given name of Latin origin. Janus is the Roman god of beginnings, gates, transitions, time, duality, doorways, passages and endings. The name has also been used as a Latinisation of Jan or Johannes. The name has been used in Denmark. In January 2015, 1,305 Danes had the name Janus, according to Statistics Denmark.

People
Notable people with the name include:

Janus Adams (born 1947), American journalist, historian and radio presenter
Janus Braspennincx (1903–1977), Dutch cyclist
Janus Cornarius (c. 1500–1558), Saxon humanist and classical philologist
Janus la Cour (1837–1909), Danish painter
Janus Henricus Donker Curtius (1813–1879), Dutch businessman and diplomat
Janus Djurhuus (1881–1948), Faroese poet
Janus Dousa (1545–1604),  Dutch statesman, jurist, historian, poet, philologist and librarian
Janus Drachmann (born 1988), Danish footballer
Janus Friis (born 1976), Danish entrepreneur
Janus August Garde (1823–1893), Danish politician and Governor-General of the Danish West Indies
Janus Genelli (1761–1813), German painter
Janus van der Gijp (1921–1988), Dutch footballer
Janus Guðlaugsson (born 1955), Icelandic footballer and coach
Janus Hellemons (1912–1999), Dutch cyclist
Janus Kamban (1913–2009), Faroese sculptor
Janus Lauritz Andreas Kolderup-Rosenvinge (1792–1850), Danish jurist and legal historian
Janus Lascaris (c. 1445–1535), Greek scholar in the Renaissance
Janus Lernutius (1545–1619), Latin poet from the Habsburg Netherlands
Janus van Merrienboer (1894–1947), Dutch archer
Janus Ooms (1866–1924), Dutch rower
Janus Pannonius (1434–1472), Croat-Hungarian Latinist, poet, diplomat and Bishop of Pécs
Janus Metz Pedersen (born 1974), Danish film director
Janus del Prado (born 1984), Filipino actor
Janus Robberts (born 1979), South African athlete
Janus Daði Smárason (born 1995), Icelandic handball player
Janus Theeuwes (1886–1975), Dutch archer
Janus van der Zande (1924–2016), Dutch marathon runner

See also
Janusz

References

Masculine given names
Danish masculine given names
Dutch masculine given names
Theophoric names